Woodson Bridge State Recreation Area is a woodland park located along the Sacramento River in Tehama County, California.

References

External links 
 Official site

California State Recreation Areas
Parks in Tehama County, California